Ross Blacklock (born July 9, 1998) is an American football defensive end for the Minnesota Vikings of the National Football League (NFL). He played college football at TCU.

Early years
Blacklock's father, Jimmy, played for and later served as a coach for the Harlem Globetrotters. Growing up in Missouri City, Texas, Blacklock became a football star at Elkins High School. Following his senior season for the Knights, he was selected to play in the 2016 U.S. Army All-American Game and verbally committed to play college football at TCU during the broadcast of the game.

College career
After redshirting during his first season on campus in Fort Worth, Blacklock became a full-time starter as a redshirt freshman in 2017, helping lead the Frogs to the program's first-ever berth in the Big 12 Championship Game and a win in the 2017 Alamo Bowl over Stanford. His individual performance earned him Big 12 Defensive Player of the Year honors as well as Freshman All-American honors from the Football Writers Association of America.

In August 2018, Blacklock suffered an injury caused him to miss his entire sophomore season. Nine months later, he was cleared by doctors to return for his junior season in 2019. Following a junior season where he was named to the first-team All-Big 12, Blacklock announced that he would forgo his senior season and declare for the 2020 NFL Draft.

Professional career

Houston Texans
Blacklock was selected in the second round of the 2020 NFL Draft with the 40th pick by the Houston Texans, their first choice in the draft. The Texans originally obtained this pick in the trade that sent DeAndre Hopkins to the Arizona Cardinals for David Johnson.

In Week 2 against the Baltimore Ravens, Blacklock was ejected from the game late in the fourth quarter after throwing a punch.  In his first year as a professional, Blacklock did not live up to expectations.  He finished his first season with 14 tackles, including one tackle for a loss, and no sacks.

Minnesota Vikings
On August 30, 2022, Blacklock and a seventh-round pick were traded to the Minnesota Vikings for a sixth-round pick.

References

External links
TCU Horned Frogs bio

1998 births
Living people
American football defensive tackles
People from Missouri City, Texas
Players of American football from Texas
Sportspeople from Harris County, Texas
TCU Horned Frogs football players
Houston Texans players
Minnesota Vikings players